The Joint Support Service Command is the high command of the Joint Support Service of the German armed forces, the Bundeswehr. The command is responsible for management and administration of the units and elements of the Joint Support Service, and for ensuring operational readiness across the armed services. Formed on 29 September 2012 as part of the restructuring of the Bundeswehr, it is based in Bonn. Its commander and deputy commander each have the rank of lieutenant general or vice admiral.

References 

Bundeswehr
Joint Support Service (Germany)